A List of landforms of the Nellis & Wildlife 5 Ranges region.

The following ranges are:

 Desert National Wildlife Range
 National Wildhorse Management Area
 Air Force Test Flight Center – (Area 51 – Groom Lake, Nevada)
 Nellis Air Force Range
 Nevada Test Site

The five contiguous regions are located north and northwest of Las Vegas, Nevada. The Las Vegas Range of the Desert National Wildlife Range borders the north perimeter of North Las Vegas.

This list in incomplete; you can help by expanding it.

List of landforms

Desert National Wildlife Range
Mountain Ranges
Buried Hills
Desert Range
East Desert Range
Las Vegas Range
Ranger Mountains
Sheep Range
Spotted Range
Pintwater Range

Other landforms
Corn Creek Dunes
Corn Creek Springs
Desert Lake (Nevada)
Dog Bone Lake
Indian Springs Valley
Three Lakes Valley (Nevada)

Associated:
Indian Springs, Nevada
Mercury, Nevada
U.S. Route 93 in Nevada

Groom Lake, Nevada
Emigrant Valley
Groom Lake

Associated:
Papoose Lake

National Wildhorse Management Area
Belted Range
Gold Reed (site)
Kawich Valley
Kawich Range

Associated:
Cedar Pipeline Ranch
Railroad Valley
U.S. Route 93 in Nevada

Nellis Air Force Range
The Nellis Air Force Range contains all of the Desert National Wildlife Range, except in the entire east, the Sheep and Las Vegas Ranges, and Desert Lake.

Mountain ranges
Belted Range
Cactus Range
Groom Range

Landforms
Amargosa River-(headwaters)
Antelope Lake, west Nye County
Cactus Flat
Emigrant Valley
Gold Flat
Mellan (site)
Mud Lake, in Nye County
Pahute Mesa
Stonewall Mountain, western Nye County

Associated:
Chispa Hills
Goldfield, Nevada
Ralston (site) 
Scotty's Junction, Nevada
Stonewall Pass
U.S. Route 93 in Nevada
U.S. Route 95 in Nevada

Nevada Test Site
Mountain ranges
Eleana Range
Skull Mountain

Landforms
Amargosa Desert
Amargosa Valley, Nevada
Frenchman Lake
South Silent Canyon

Associated:
Mercury, Nevada
Specter Range

Mountain ranges inside the 5 regions

Buried Hills
Belted Range
Cactus Range
Desert Range
East Desert Range
Eleana Range
Groom Range
Kawich Range
Las Vegas Range
Ranger Mountains
Sheep Range
Spotted Range
Pintwater Range

See also
Amargosa Desert
Amargosa Valley
Nellis - Wildlife five contiguous range region
Desert National Wildlife Refuge Complex

Landforms of the Nellis
Nellis
Geography of Clark County, Nevada
Geography of Lincoln County, Nevada
Geography of Nye County, Nevada